The Makarov Basin is a seafloor basin in the Arctic Ocean, part of the Amerasian Basin. It lies between the Alpha Ridge and the Lomonosov Ridge.

Arctic Ocean